Brave was a bimonthly American zine and digital media company. Founded by Ryan Latrell, it focused on pop culture and fashion. Its coverage included art, film, music, design, celebrities, interviews, and technology.

Features
The first nine issues featured the following people:

 Romeo Miller
 Sammie
 Nina Sky
 Tiffany Evans
 Jacob Payne
 Teshawna Graham 
 Dawn Richard
 B Smyth 
 Justin Walker 
 Spectacular
 Hollywood East
 Cruch Calhoun

Name change
On July 4, 2018, editor in cheif Ryan Latrell announced that Braves magazine would resurface under the new title of Riot Magazine.

References

Magazines published in Los Angeles
Magazines established in 2012
Lifestyle magazines published in the United States
Bimonthly magazines published in the United States
Fashion magazines published in the United States